The European Partnership for Democracy (EPD) is a membership-based network of not-for-profit organisations that describes its aim as "supporting democracy around the world". 

EPD is composed of eighteen European organisations with activities in over 140 countries in Africa, Asia, Europe, the Middle East and Latin America. It is the most important European network of specialised organisations actively involved in democracy support.  EPD Secretariat is headquartered in Brussels, Belgium.

Creation
The European Partnership for Democracy was created in April 2008 with a strong role played by the Central and Eastern European countries that had become full members states of the European Union in 2004. The newly joined countries had until then had little influence on European Union financial transfers claimed to promote worldwide democracy and human rights. The EPD was initially seen as the European equivalent of the United States federally-funded National Endowment for Democracy, aiming to receive direct funding from the European Commission (EC). According to Carnegie Endowment for International Peace, "various European political foundations" opposed the direct funding, and the direct funding from the EC was rejected.

According to its status, EPD has the "purpose of making a contribution to, and reinforcing the impact of European endeavours in democracy assistance across the world. In doing so, the organisation is by nature a community of practice bringing together the know-how of European organisations implementing democracy support programmes" (Article 3 of the EPD statutes).

In his historical dictionary of democracy, scholar Norman Abjorensen writes that EPD "was set up to further European democracy assistance across the world, and has operated in about 140 countries, working with civil society organizations, faith-based organisations, media outlets, elections-management bodies, the private sector, political parties, elected institutions at national and local levels, and the security and justice sectors."

Objectives and functioning
EPD has long advocated to put democracy at the center of EU external policies to improve development and cooperation policies outcomes. Building on the expertise of the network, EPD participates in EU level consultations and roadmaps and contributed with policy inputs to the EU Action Plan for Democracy and Human Rights 2020–2024. Another example of EPD strategic position is the adoption of the 2019 Council Conclusions on Democracy by EU member states. EPD's work on supporting democracy within the EU is also significant. In 2020, it brought together 48 European civil society organisations into an input paper aiming at supporting the formulation of the European Democracy Action Plan (EDAP), which includes action points on the European Citizens Initiatives, expanded EU Rule of Law mechanism, decentralised funding framework for tackling disinformation and transparency measures to deal with political advertising.

Acting as a Community of Practice, EPD mobilises the network expertise, among others, through joint-programming, joint-advocacy, thematic and geographical working groups, and peer-to-peer ad hoc support to encourage interaction between them for the benefit of consolidating the impact of democracy support assistance programmes. That is, a group of organisations which work together to improve the way they operate in the realm of democracy support. This notion does not only apply to EPD as a network and its institutional development, but also to all the actions, joint statements, coalitions and partnerships constructed under the EPD banner.

The members of EPD have come together to create joint approaches that make the most of the comparative advantage of the network. Due to the expertise from different sectors and the variety of experience in terms of partners, EPD builds on a holistic approach to democratic development. EPD has developed different joint approaches that are implemented around the world, either stand alone or within other projects. These are on assessing leverage to increase civic space (SPACE) and locally owned policy dialogues processes (INSPIRED). Former Spanish Primer Minister José Luis Rodríguez Zapatero took notably part in an INSPIRED mission to Cape Verde in 2018 to promote the labour rights of women who work in the domestic service.

Internal organisation 
EPD's organisational structure is composed of a General Assembly composed of all members organisation, a Board of Directors and a Secretariat.

EPD is managed by a Board of Directors composed of eight members elected among the organisations composing EPD. The Board is composed of a president, currently Antonella Valmorbida, the Secretary General of the European Association for Local Democracy, a vice-president, currently Thijs Berman, the Executive Director of the Netherlands Institute for Multiparty Democracy and a treasurer, currently Anthony Smith, the Chief Executive Officer of the Westminster Foundation for Democracy.

The EPD secretariat is based in Brussels and is in charge of coordinating the 19 members, with the aim to further reinforce the cooperation between them and with the EU institutions, and to facilitate the achievement of their policy and programming goals.

Members 
 Article 19
 ALDA - European Association for Local Democracy 
 Netherlands Institute for Multiparty Democracy 
 Club de Madrid 
 Danish Institute for Parties and Democracy 
 Democracy Reporting International
 Demo Finland
 EDGE Foundation
 Elbarlament
 Election-Watch.EU
 European Exchange
 Netherlands Helsinki Committee
 French Agency for Media Cooperation
 Institute for Political Sciences of the Catholic University of Portugal
 Kofi Annan Foundation
 Oslo Centre
 People in Need 
 Westminster Foundation for Democracy

Partners 
EPD Secretariat is a member of Human Rights and Democracy Network, CONCORD and SDG Watch Europe.

EPD collaborates with Carnegie Endowment for International Peace on the European Democracy Hub, a permanent hub for expertise on democracy support seeks to fill the gap between programme evaluations and global assessments of the state of democracy, with analysis and evidence-gathering of European democracy support policies and programming.

References

External links

Organisations based in Brussels